ACMA or Acma may refer to:

 Academy of Country Music Awards, an American country music award show
 Açma, Gölyaka, a village in Turkey
 Advisory Council for Multicultural Affairs, an Australian government agency around 1989
 American Composites Manufacturers Association, the trade association for composites manufacturers in the US
 Arts & Communication Magnet Academy, a middle and high school in Beaverton, Oregon
 Associate Chartered Management Accountant, a designation used by associate members of the Chartered Institute of Management Accountants, a UK-based professional body
 Ateliers de construction de motocycles et d'automobiles, a French builder of motorcycles, scooters and micro-cars
 Australasian Computer Music Association, a non-profit Australia and New Zealand based organisation which aims to promote electroacoustic and computer music
 Australian Communications and Media Authority, the Australian government regulation agency for broadcasting, radio communications and telecommunications
 Automotive Component Manufacturers Association of India, organisation representing manufacturers in the Indian auto component industry